Have a Little Faith is the fourteenth studio album by Joe Cocker, released in 1994 by 550 Music, a former unit of Sony Music Entertainment. The album peaked at number 8 on the UK Albums Charts. Music videos were released for "Let the Healing Begin", "Have a Little Faith in Me", "The Simple Things", "Summer in the City" and "Take Me Home" duet with Bekka Bramlett.

Track listing
 "Let the Healing Begin" – 5:12 (Tony Joe White)
 "Have a Little Faith in Me" – 4:40 (John Hiatt)
 "The Simple Things" – 4:54 (Rick Neigher, Phil Roy, John Shanks)
 "Summer in the City" – 4:10 (Steve Boone, Mark Sebastian, John Sebastian)
 "The Great Divide" – 3:33 (Dillon O'Brian, J.D. Souther)
 "Highway Highway" – 4:31 (Stephen Allen Davis)
 "Too Cool" – 4:45 (Kye Fleming, Greg Sutton)
 "Soul Time" – 4:35 (Will Jennings, Frankie Miller)
 "Out of the Blue" – 3:45 (Robbie Robertson)
 "Angeline" – 4:30 (Cocker, Tony Joe White)
 "Hell And Highwater" – 4:12
 "Standing Knee Deep in a River" – 4:09 (Bucky Jones, Dickey Lee, Bob McDill)
 "Take Me Home" – 4:21 (John Capek, Marc Jordan, Steve Kipner) – duet with Bekka Bramlett

Bonus Tracks
 "My Strongest Weakness" – 4:12 (Mike Reid, Naomi Judd)

Personnel

 Joe Cocker – lead vocals (all tracks)
 Tony Joe White – guitar (1, 10)
 Tim Pierce – guitar solo (1, 10),  guitar (2-7, 9-12), Dobro (11)
 Michael Thompson – guitar (8, 13)
 C. J. Vanston – acoustic piano (1, 8, 9, 13), organ (1, 2, 4, 5, 7, 8, 10-12), synthesizers (1, 2, 4-6, 9, 12, 13), string arrangements (1, 4, 6), keyboards (3), synth harmonica solo (3), percussion (3), horn arrangements (4, 7), vibraphone (7), synth horns (8, 11)
 Chris Stainton – Wurlitzer (1, 4), acoustic piano (2, 5-7, 11, 12), organ (9), Rhodes (10)
 Bob Feit – bass guitar (1, 2, 4-13)
 Abraham Laboriel – bass guitar (3)
 Jack Bruno – drums (all tracks)
 Lenny Castro – percussion (1, 2, 4, 7, 10, 11)
 Don Shelton – saxophone (4, 7)
 Ernie Watts – alto sax solo (5, 13)
 Alexander Iles – trombone (4, 7)
 Rick Baptist – trumpet (4, 7)
 Wayne Bergeron – trumpet (4, 7)
 Alexandra Brown – backing vocals (1, 2)
 Mortonette Jenkins – backing vocals (1, 2)
 Marlena Jeter – backing vocals (1, 2)
 Joey Diggs – backing vocals (3, 8, 12, 13)
 Lamont VanHook – backing vocals (3, 8, 12, 13)
 Fred White – backing vocals (3, 8, 12, 13)
 Carmen Twillie – backing vocals (4)
 Maxine Waters – backing vocals (4, 11)
 Julie Waters – backing vocals (4, 11)
 Steve Kipner – backing vocals (13)
 Bekka Bramlett – lead vocals (13)

Production
 Joe Cocker – executive producer 
 Roger Davies – producer
 Chris Lord-Alge – producer, engineer, mixing
 Dick Marx – conductor, orchestration
 Israel Baker – concertmaster
 Craig Brock – engineer
 Ken Villeneuve – engineer
 Ben Wallach – engineer
 Randy Wine – engineer
 Doug Sax – mastering
 Norman Moore – art direction, design
 Greg Gorman – photography
 Frank Ockenfels – photography

Studios
 Recorded at Record Plant, A&M Studios and Image Recording Studios (Los Angeles, CA).
 Mixed at Image Recording Studios (Los Angeles, CA).
 Mastered at The Mastering Lab (Hollywood, CA).

Charts

Weekly charts

Year-end charts

Certifications

References

1994 albums
Joe Cocker albums
Albums produced by Chris Lord-Alge